Deakin Volz (born May 6, 1997) is an American track and field athlete, known for pole vault, though he has also had success in the high jump. Deakin comes from a family line of vaulters as his brothers Drake and Drew are also pole vaulters. They are all coached by their father, 1992 Olympian Dave Volz, made famous for inventing his namesake technique of replacing the crossbar while still in the air. The now banned technique, named after the elder Volz, embeds the family name in the modern rulebook.

Deakin and his brothers vault for Bloomington High School South, where Deakin is the two time Indiana state champion, winning in 2015, his senior year by over a foot.  Since graduating, Deakin competes for Virginia Tech, while his older brothers jumped for their father's alma mater, hometown Indiana.

References

External links 
 

1997 births
Living people
Track and field athletes from Indiana
American male pole vaulters
World Athletics U20 Championships winners
Virginia Tech Hokies men's track and field athletes